The Battle of Route Bismarck was a series of military engagements fought between Australian forces from Overwatch Battle Group (West) 2 in southern Iraq, and Anti-coalition insurgents over the period 23–24 April 2007. The engagements occurred on Route Bismarck, the Secondary Supply Route (SSR) within Dhi Qar Province, Iraq. Three Australians were wounded by IEDs which also damaged a number of ASLAVs, while a number of insurgents were killed or wounded by the Australians in the fighting that ensued.

Notes

Further reading
  

Conflicts in 2007
2007 in Iraq
Battles of the Iraq War in 2007
Battles of the Iraq War involving Australia
Iraqi insurgency (2003–2011)
April 2007 events in Iraq